Gradišče nad Prvačino is a village in western Slovenia in the Municipality of Nova Gorica. It is located in the Vipava Valley in the Gorizia region and is a satellite settlement of Prvačina.

Name
The name of the settlement was changed from Gradišče to Gradišče pri Zalem Hribu in 1953. It was then changed from Gradišče pri Zalem Hribu to Gradišče nad Prvačino in 1955.

Church
The parish church in the settlement is dedicated to the Virgin Mary and belongs to the Diocese of Koper.

Notable people
Notable people that were born or lived in Gradišče nad Prvačino include:
Simon Gregorčič (1844–1906), Slovene poet, lived in Gradišče nad Prvačino from 1882 to 1903
Josip Tominc (1790–1866), Italian-Slovene painter

References

External links

Gradišče nad Prvačino on Geopedia

Populated places in the City Municipality of Nova Gorica